Claude Faraldo (March 23, 1936 – January 30, 2008) was a French actor, screenwriter and film director. He was born to Italian immigrants. He directed the French cult film classic Themroc (1973).

References

External links 
 

1936 births
2008 deaths
French film directors
French male screenwriters
20th-century French screenwriters
Male actors from Paris
French male film actors
French male television actors
French male non-fiction writers
French people of Italian descent
French satirists
20th-century French male writers